Osteospermum spinosum is a species of plant from South Africa.

Description 
This strongly and intricately branched shrub is aromatic and somewhat sticky. Pale yellow flowers occur at the ends of the branches. They are most commonly present between May and October. After they fall and die, the stem holding them may be modified into spines. The achenes (small, dry fruit that contain a single seed) are dry and angled.

Distribution and habitat 
This species is endemic to South Africa. It is found in the Pakhuis Mountains, the Tulbagh Mountains and the Riviersonderend Mountains. It grows on gravelly slopes and flats, mostly at lower elevations.

References 

Calenduleae
Endemic flora of South Africa